Saul Mielziner (June 1, 1905 – October 13, 1985) was an American football center. He played for the New York Giants from 1929 to 1930 and for the Brooklyn Dodgers from 1931 to 1934.

References

1905 births
1985 deaths
American football centers
American football guards
American football tackles
American football linebackers
Carnegie Mellon Tartans football players
New York Giants players
Brooklyn Dodgers (NFL) players